The Journal of the Royal Naval Medical Service (J. Roy. Nav. Med. Serv.) is a medical journal that was established in 1915 and is published by the Royal Naval Medical Service based in the Institute of Naval Medicine. The JRNMS is the RN medical branch's institutional memory and the forum by which new discoveries, techniques and approaches are shared to ensure the service continues to develop, improve and excel. The journal is peer-reviewed and listed in pubmed. All articles are freely available as .pdf files one year after publication.

Further reading 
 Oliver TP., 67 years ago—the Journal of the Royal Naval Medical Service Vol 1, No 1., J. R. Nav. Med. Serv. 1982;68(2):98-101.

External links 
  www.JRNMS.com
  

English-language journals
General medical journals
Gosport
Health in Hampshire
Military medicine in the United Kingdom
Publications established in 1915
Royal Navy Medical Service